Fredrik Jan-Ove Stillman (born August 22, 1966) is a Swedish former professional ice hockey player, currently general manager for HV71 in the Swedish elite league Elitserien.

Playing career 
Stillman, sometimes locally called "Mr. HV", played as a defender when active, until suffering from a shoulder injury, which he received during a training match against IF Troja-Ljungby in 2000, made it impossible for him to continue his active playing career. He has only played for one club, HV71, in the Swedish Elitserien during his career, although during two seasons, 1995–96 and 1999–00, he played in the German ice hockey league DEL with Berlin Capitals. He still holds HV71's club records of most career assists (197) and career points (287). On December 26, 2001, Stillman's jersey, no. 14, along with Stefan Örnskog's no. 15, were retired during a ceremony before a match against Frölunda HC in Kinnarps Arena.

Managing career 
After season 2000-01 Stillman retired from his active playing career and was appointed assistant coach to Pär Mårts in HV71. In March 2005, when HV71 contracted Göran Sjöberg as assistant coach, Stillman was appointed team manager, a position which he still holds.

In 2008, Stillman won the Swedish Championship as general manager of HV71. Previously he had won the championship as a player in 1995 and as coach in 2004.

Awards 
 Gold medal at the World Championships in 1991 and 1992.
 Silver medal at the World Championships in 1993 and 1995.
 Named to the Swedish All-Star Team in 1993.
 Gold medal at the Winter Olympics in 1994.
 Bronze medal at the World Championships in 1994.
 Swedish Champion with HV71 in 1995.
 SHL Most Points by Defenseman (37) in 1996–1997.
 Swedish Champion with HV71 in 2004 as coach.
 Swedish Champion with HV71 in 2008 as general manager.

Records 
 HV71's franchise record for career assists (197).
 HV71's franchise record for career points (287).

Career statistics

Regular season and playoffs

International

References

1966 births
Berlin Capitals players
HV71 players
Ice hockey players with retired numbers
Ice hockey players at the 1992 Winter Olympics
Ice hockey players at the 1994 Winter Olympics
Living people
Medalists at the 1994 Winter Olympics
Olympic gold medalists for Sweden
Olympic ice hockey players of Sweden
Olympic medalists in ice hockey
Sportspeople from Jönköping
Swedish expatriate ice hockey players in Germany
Swedish ice hockey managers
Swedish ice hockey defencemen